is a town located in Tokachi Subprefecture, Hokkaido, Japan.

As of September 2016, the town has an estimated population of 7,150 and a density of 5.1 persons per km2. The total area is 1,408.09 km2.

It was the largest municipality in Japan until the merger of Takayama City, Gifu Prefecture on February 1, 2005. Main industries of the town include dairying and farming of sugar beet and wheat.

Lake Onnetō is a major attraction of the town and is a part of Akan National Park.

Population
As of January 31, 2015, the total population of The Town of Ashoro is 7,339, with a total of 3,540 men and 3,799 women. The Town of Ashoro's population density is 5.09 people per square kilometer. The county of Ashoro's, Ashoro-gun, population is 9,692 with a population density of 4.81per square km. Like many communities in the Tokachi prefecture, the Town of Ashoro has seen a decline in population. The 1999 census concluded there were 9,409 people living in Ashoro. The total area is 1,408.09 km2

Geography
Ashoro is located in the northeastern part of the Tokachi. Kushiro and Shiranuka is to the east and to the south are Honebestu and Obihiro. Kamishiro is to the west and to the north is Oketo, Rikubestu and Tsubetsu. Ashoro is 
Ashoro consists of rolling foothills and is nestled at the base of Mount Meakan. Ashoro-gun is 66.5 km wide and 48.2 km long and is 1,408.09K m2. Ashoro is considered a wide town. 83 percent of the town's land is forested.

Climate
Ashoro is influenced by the Tokachi inland climate; temperature differences are large with less precipitation but have many sunny days. On average Ashoro receives 846.5 mm of rain with August being the wettest month, 151 mm of precipitation and February being the dries, 4.5 mm of precipitation. On average temperatures vary from 23.2 degrees Celsius in August and dropping to -8 in January.

Economy
Agriculture and forestry are the key industries in Ashoro. Wheat, sugar beets and beans are the representative crops. As of 2011 there are approximately 30,000 beef and dairy cows in Ashoro. That is over three times the population of Ashoro. Dairy cows make up 32% of all cattle and Wagyu cattle 37% respectively. In 2004 Ashoro issued the "Declaration of a Town that Promotes Pasture-Based Dairy Farming" to utilize the large expanses of grassland which can be found in the hilly and mountainous areas. 83% of the towns land is forested and the local Japanese larch wood is used for new public buildings. This beautiful wood can be seen in the Town Hall and the Ashoro Junior High.

Biomass
The town government plans to build a local system that provides biomass resources and ways to use them. Ashoro produces wood pellets from untapped wood and promotes biogas plants that use livestock manure.

Transportation

The main way around Ashoro is by vehicle but at comprehensive bus system does exist. A bus runs from Ashoro to Obihiro nine times a day. Ashoro has two national highways that meet in Ashoro, Highway 241 runs east/west, and Highway 242 runs north/south. In 2003 the Dotto Expressway opened in Ashoro, connecting it to major centers such as Obihiro and Sapporo. In 1910 the first railway between Ikeda and Ashoro opened. The railway was extended and eventually connected Ashoro to Obihiro and Sapporo. The rail way station recently closed. The old rail station has now become a tourist landmark celebrating the town's history and significant figures.

Recreation
Various recreation facilities exist in Ashoro. The first town gymnasium opened in 1990 and was followed with a heated pool in 1994. Various baseball diamonds and soccer fields exist as well in the winter elementary schools create speed skating rinks. Ashoro also boasts many park golf courses that are available to all citizens. Citizens also participate in other cultural activities like kyūdō and taiko.

Napal Center

Ashoro is home to one of the five Napal Centres (Nature-pal). This center is used for various activities such as English camps, outdoor camps, floor curling and is often used to house sports teams or people from out of town. It promotes nature and community spirit.

Tourism

Ashoro is the gateway to Lake Onneto, Lake Akan and Mount Meakan. Citizens from all over Japan and the world come to visits these sights.

Butterbur
Ashoro is also known for its large butterbur that can grow up to three meters tall and have a diameter of 10 cm. Butterbur plays such a significant role that the town mascot, Ayumi-chan, carries a piece of butterbur. Rawan butterbur is nationally renowned and has been designated as a Hokkaido Heritage.

Ashoro Museum of Paleontology
This museum is located in Ashoro and is dedicated to fossils found around Ashoro and Japan. It has a unique program that allows visitors to excavate a genuine fossil or crystal. It also offers educational programs to the youth of Ashoro.

Mascot 

Ashoro's official town mascot character is named , selected to promote the town in 1989. There are two generations of the mascot, and both are used today for town events.

The first generation of the mascot was used around 1990. Due to his peculiar appearance, he was unpopular with children. He can be described as a large pink right foot with large toes, and a smiling face on the shortened sole/torso with a concerned looking unibrow. He  has arms, long legs, and is wearing dark blue mittens and shoes. He is also holding a giant butterbur (rawan-buki) stalk.

Right foot Ayumi-chan was stored in a warehouse when the second generation was created. He was put away in the late 2000's and was brought back out in April 2021 when characters that are creepy/cute characters started gaining popularity in popular culture.

Second generation Ayumi-chan is a left foot, and is characterized as cute, friendly, and gentle. Since her appearance in the early 2010's, she has been very popular with children.

Her appearance can be described as a large, more proportionate pink foot, with sparkling eyes, a friendly looking smiling face, short legs, and arms. She is wearing green gloves and boots, also holding a giant butterbur stalk.

Both versions of Ayumi-chan are considered to be athletic and take part in different town sporting events. They also make an appearance during other cultural town events and have an active role in the town's social media pages.

In 2021, the town released Ayumi-chan LINE stickers of both characters for Japan's commonly used messaging app.

Education

Ashoro has various education facilities:

Day Cares:
4 centres (Ashoro, Rawan, Meto, and Kamitosibetsu)

Elementary Schools
4 schools (Ashoro, Rawan, Meto, and Oyochi)

Junior High Schools
1 school (Ashoro Junior High School)

High Schools
1 school (Ashoro High School)

Sister City and International Exchange

In 1990, the Municipal Councils in Ashoro and in Wetaskiwin passed motions to proceed with the formal Sister-Cities Affiliation with the goal being 
"...to facilitate cross-cultural friendship and good will between the citizen of the city of Wetaskiwin and the citizens of Ashoro, Japan. In so doing, the society will encourage cultural exchanges, will promote and understanding of Japanese culture, and will facilitate the exchange of information and fellowship between groups and individuals in our respective communities."

Since 1992, the Town of Ashoro has sent a student study tours to Wetaskiwin every second year but starting in 2013 all grade 10 students attending Ashoro High School have partaken in the exchange. The motive behind sending all grade 10 students was to curb declining enrollments at Ashoro High School. Starting in 1994 Wetaskiwin has sent a student study tour, every second year, to Ashoro with a brief lapse between 2000 and 2009.

Ashoro has also hired a Coordinator of International Relations, since 1992, from the City of Wetaskiwin. The Coordinator of International Relations position was created to ease communications between Wetaskiwin and Ashoro. As well responsibilities are; assisting and teaching English to students aged 2–16, facilitating student exchanges, organizing and assisting with after school and weekend programs, editing documents, and acting as a cultural liaison.

Famous Persons
Chiharu Matsuyama - singer
Muneo Suzuki - politician
Tomohiro Ishikawa - politician
Masazō Nonaka - world's oldest living man, January 2018-January 2019

References

External links

Official Website 

Towns in Hokkaido